Stenella palmicola is a species of anamorphic fungi.

References

External links

palmicola
Fungi described in 1985